Canvassing is the systematic initiation of direct contact with individuals, commonly used during political campaigns.

Canvassing or Canvass may also refer to:

"Canvassing" (Parks and Recreation), an episode of the TV series
Peddling, or canvassing, by a traveling vendor of goods
Vote counting and validation of the outcome, in the United States
Canvass White (1790–1834), an American engineer and inventor

See also

Canvas, an extremely durable plain-woven fabric
Canvas fingerprinting, a browser fingerprinting technique